Windrush is a village and civil parish in Gloucestershire, England, approximately five miles southeast of Northleach. It lies in the Cotswolds on the River Windrush, from which it derives its name. The village name is first attested in the Domesday Book of 1086, where it appears as Wenric.

History
The National Gazetteer of Great Britain and Ireland (1868) says: 

During the Second World War, the parish hosted RAF Windrush, a Royal Air Force Relief Landing Ground. Although it closed for military purposes in 1945, the airfield remains in use for light aircraft and still has its control tower.

Governance
Windrush forms part of the Cotswold District, which together with Gloucestershire County Council provides local government services. It is part of the parliamentary constituency of Cotswold, represented in parliament by the Conservative Geoffrey Clifton-Brown.

Notable people
Thomas Keble, the younger brother of John Keble and also a notable Church of England clergyman, had charge of the parish of Windrush in the early 19th century.

Notes

Villages in Gloucestershire
Cotswold District